The 2014 Havering Council election took place on 22 May 2014 to elect members of Havering Council in England. This was on the same day as other local elections. The Conservative Party ceased to have a majority of councillors, putting the council in no overall control (NOC). Despite the various residents associations winning the most seats, an agreement was not struck and a Conservative Party minority administration was formed.

Summary of results 
All 5 major UK political parties, in addition to any parties gaining ~1% of the vote or above, are shown:

Ward Summaries

Brooklands

Cranham

Elm Park

Emerson Park

Gooshays

Hacton

Harold Wood

Havering Park

Heaton

Hylands

Mawneys

Pettits

Rainham and Wennington

References

Havering
2014